Édouard Joseph Marc Maunick (23 September 1931 – 10 April 2021) was a Mauritian poet, critic, and translator.

Biography 
Maunick was a métis or mulatto, and as such was the subject of discrimination from both blacks and whites.  He worked briefly as a librarian in Port-Louis before going to Paris in 1960, where he wrote, lectured, and directed for Coopération Radiophonique.  He was also a frequent contributor to Présence Africaine and other journals.

Maunick's work was based not in the more traditional search for roots to establish an individual identity.  Instead, he lamented his own isolation and the persecution of his people in poetry collections such as C.

On 16 October 2003 Edouard Maunick received the Grand prix de la francophonie, awarded by the Académie française. He won the 1977 Prix Guillaume Apollinaire for Ensoleillé vif.

Family 
Édouard Maunick grew up with his siblings Ursule, Jacques, Jean and Gérard in British Mauritius. Édouard Maunick's elder sister Lady Ursule Ramdanee is Kobita Jugnauth's mother. Jacques Maunick is a journalist, radio presenter and a former director of MBC Radio. 

His son, Jean-Paul Maunick is a record producer and the founder of the band Incognito.

References

Sources
Édouard J. Maunick, biography, bibliography, links and recordings of the poet reading his work (in French; Île en île).
Label France: One hundred creative artists who have chosen France - Edouard Maunick, the marriage of French and Creole.
Review of Elle & île - Poèmes d'une même passion

20th-century Mauritian writers
1931 births
2021 deaths
21st-century Mauritian writers
Mauritian poets
Prix Guillaume Apollinaire winners